Microfauna (Ancient Greek mikros "small" + New Latin fauna "animal") refers to microscopic animals and organisms that exhibit animal-like qualities.  Microfauna are represented in the animal kingdom (e.g., nematodes, small arthropods) and the protist kingdom (i.e., protozoans).

Habitat
Microfauna are present in every habitat on Earth.  They fill essential roles as decomposers and food sources for lower trophic levels, and are necessary to drive processes within larger organisms.

Role
One particular example of the role of microfauna can be seen in soil, where they are important in the cycling of nutrients in ecosystems. Soil microfauna are capable of digesting just about any organic substance, and some inorganic substances.  These organisms are often essential links in the food chain between primary producers and larger species. For example, zooplankton are widespread microscopic animals and protists which feed on algae and detritus in the ocean, such as foraminifera. Microfauna also aid in digestion and other processes in larger organisms.

Cryptozoa
The microfauna are the least understood of soil life, due to their small size and great diversity. Many microfauna are members of the so-called cryptozoa, animals that remain undescribed by science. Out of the estimated 10-20 million animal species in the world, only 1.8 million have been given scientific names, and many of the remaining millions are likely microfauna, much of it from the tropics.

Phyla

Notable phyla include:
 Microscopic arthropods, including dust mites, spider mites, and some crustaceans such as copepods and certain cladocera.
 Tardigrades ("water bears")
 Rotifers, which are filter feeders that are usually found in fresh water.
 Some nematode species
 Many loricifera, including the recently discovered anaerobic species, which spend their entire lives in an anoxic environment.

See also
 Fauna
 Megafauna
 Mesofauna

References

External links
 The role of soil microfauna in Plant disease suppression. University of California

Zoology
Microscopic animals